William J. Kountz Jr. (October 1, 1867 – August 18, 1899) was an American businessman and an early football player for the Allegheny Athletic Association. He gained brief fame as a humorist with his "Billy Baxter" letters.

Early life
Kountz was born in Allegheny, Pennsylvania and graduated from its public and high schools. His father was "Commodore" William J. Kountz, a businessman and steamboat line owner. Kountz Jr. attended the Chester Military Academy (now Widener University) for two years before joining the Nicola lumber firm as a traveling salesman. He later established a brickworks with his brother George at Harmarville, Pennsylvania.

Football career
Kountz played guard for the Allegheny Athletic Association from 1891 to 1894. The Pittsburg Press described him as "as big as the side of a house and as strong as a horse and as good natured as the average."

In addition to playing guard, Kountz served as Allegheny's manager in 1892, the season in which the team fielded the first recorded professional football player, William "Pudge" Heffelfinger. Kountz took over the manager's job from O. D. Thompson, who resigned after the 1891 season. After Allegheny's 6–6 tie against their rival the Pittsburgh Athletic Club in October 1892, Kountz told the Pittsburgh media that Allegheny would not be using any "ringers" for a November rematch. However, on the day of the rematch between the two clubs, Sport Donnelly, Ed Malley and Heffelfinger of the Chicago Athletic Association Football team appeared in the Allegheny line-up. Kountz's status as team leader at that time is questionable: When a threat of a walk-out by the Pittsburgh A.C. threatened the game, Thompson, not Kountz, represented Allegheny during the negotiations. It was also Thompson who signed the team's ledger showing payment to Heffelfinger.

In 1894, Allegheny and Pittsburgh played a three game series to determine the western Pennsylvania championship team. The second game of the series was scheduled for November 6. Prior to the game, an unnamed Pittsburgh player offered the team's signals to Kountz for $20. Allegheny reported the incident to Pittsburgh and the player was dealt with properly. While both teams had hired ringers, this offense was considered blatant cheating and unacceptable. The Allegheny team went on to win the series and the championship.

"Billy Baxter" letters

Late in his short life, Kountz marketed a bottled tonic called Red Raven Splits. To promote the product, he wrote and distributed a series of humorous short story pamphlets that included Red Raven advertisements. The stories, each in the form of a letter written by "Billy Baxter" in a slangy style to his friend "Jim", were immediately and widely popular; Rollin Lynde Hartt wrote 20 years later that "no other humorist ever jumped into national fame so abruptly."

Kountz's time as a writer was cut short when he died of peritonitis and appendicitis at age 31. He was interred in Pittsburgh's Allegheny Cemetery. A posthumous compilation of his writings was published as a book titled Billy Baxter's Letters.

References

Additional sources

Allegheny Athletic Association players
19th-century players of American football
American humorists
Burials at Allegheny Cemetery
1867 births
1899 deaths